The Garfield Range is a mountain range on Ellesmere Island, Nunavut, Canada. Like most of the mountain ranges in the Arctic, it is one of the world's northernmost mountain ranges.

The Garfield Range is located at Lake Hazen which is the world's largest lake north of the Arctic Circle by volume and acts as a barrier between the lake and the Grant Land ice cap and nunataks of the United States Range to the north. The Gilman Glacier is one of the largest glaciers draining into Lake Hazen. To the est, the mountain range extends across the Hazen Plateau while, to the west, it runs virtually to the head of Tanquary Fiord. At intervals, the range is bisected by broad valleys  in width that are occasionally filled by glacial tongues, such as the monumental Henrieta Nesmith Glacier that descends to within  of Lake Hazen near its northwestern end.

See also
List of mountain ranges
Arctic Cordillera

References

Arctic Cordillera
Mountain ranges of Qikiqtaaluk Region